The Prix Pictet (Pictet prize) is an international award in photography. It was founded in 2008 by the Geneva-based Pictet Group with the mandate to use the power of photography to communicate messages about sustainability to a global audience. Its goal is to uncover photography of the highest order, applied to current social and environmental challenges. The prize is judged by an independent jury and carries a prize of CHF 100,000.

Process

Entry to the Prix Pictet is by nomination. As of May 2019, there were over 300 Prix Pictet nominators, a group of industry experts from around the world consisting of photographers, gallerists, agency heads, academics, authors, publishers, curators, photography foundation and others.  Each nominated photographer is asked to submit a series of up to ten images, coherently defined and focused on the theme of the award.

The Prix Pictet was first awarded in 2008 and operates on a cycle of about 18 months. Past themes were Water, Earth, Growth, Power and Consumption. From May 2014 the prize has been presented in partnership with the Victoria and Albert Museum in London and the Musée d'Art Moderne de la Ville de Paris.

The judges do not discriminate between photographs of different genres, or make assumptions about the types of audience for any class of photograph.  Judging takes place in two stages - a conference to determine the shortlist, followed by a review of works by the shortlisted artists at an exhibition. Sir David King has been Chairman of the Prix Pictet jury since 2010.

The winner of the Prix Pictet receives a cash prize of CHF 100,000, announced at an opening ceremony of the exhibition of shortlisted artists.

Exhibition 

An exhibition of the shortlisted portfolios for each cycle of the Prix Pictet tours the world, reaching over a dozen countries over the touring period.  In this way the Prix Pictet presents the work of the shortlisted photographers, and the sustainability issues they highlight, to a wide international audience.

A book to accompany each cycle of the award is also published by TeNeues. The book features work by each of the shortlisted artists along with images from the wider group of nominees. It also includes essays by established writers on the theme of the prize.

Commission 

For the first five cycles of the award the Prix Pictet ran a commission in association with a charity partner. This project enabled a nominated photographer to visit a specific country or region and create a photography report on a live sustainability issue. Past charity partners have been WaterAid in 2008, SEED Madagascar in 2009, The Tusk Trust in 2011, Medair in 2013 and OneAction in 2015. This commission has been discontinued.

Themes and winners

Prix Pictet Japan Award

Inaugurated in 2015 the Prix Pictet Japan Award celebrates Japanese photographers aged 40 or under whose work carries strong messages on global sustainability. Supported by the Prunier Foundation, this prize was inaugurated in 2015 in recognition of Japan’s status as one of the great centres of world photography. Entry is by nomination and the winner receives a prize of ¥1,000,000.

There have been two cycles of the award to date. In December 2018, the exhibition ‘Prix Pictet Japan Award 2015-2017’ was held at Hillside Forum, Tokyo.

Winners

2015: Tomoko Kikuchi
2017: Lieko Shiga

References

External links

Environmental awards
Photography awards
Awards established in 2008
2008 establishments in Switzerland